Alina Şaitan (née Bîrca, born 1 May 1991) is a Moldovan footballer who plays as a goalkeeper for Women's Championship club Anenii Noi and the Moldova women's national team.

See also
List of Moldova women's international footballers

References

1991 births
Living people
Women's association football goalkeepers
Moldovan women's footballers
Moldova women's international footballers
Agarista-ȘS Anenii Noi players